Vic Taylor (1947 – June 25, 2003) was a Jamaican singer who was in well known Jamaican groups, Skatalites and Byron Lee & the Dragonaires. He died in 2003.

History

Taylor was once a member of The Skatalites  and then later on in the 1970s and 1980s, the front man of Byron Lee & the Dragonaires.

He was well known and loved on the Jamaican music scene. During his career he had some hits that included "For Your Precious Love" and "Heartaches" etc.

He moved to the US in the early Nineties, where he regularly sang on the cabaret and club scene, recently switching from Reggae and R&B to Gospel, having completed work on a religious album shortly before his passing.

Death
According to Family sources, Taylor had been feeling unwell for a couple of weeks and had complained of having chest pains.  He was hospitalised for nine days and having suffered breathing problems, he was placed on a respirator. he died on Monday 23 June 2003. His daughter Vanessa gave his age as 56.

Discography

Single
 "Dusty Road" / Version - Dama Nessa - 19?? - 
 "For Your Precious Love" / Version - Trojan Records – TR 7856 - 1972

Album
 Does It His Way - Dynamic Sounds – DY 3317 - 1972 
 Reflections - Dynamic Sounds – DY 3334 - 1973 
 Startime - Dynamic Sounds – DY 3362 - 1976  
 Goodbye Love - Dynamic Sounds – DY 3393 - 1979 
 For Lovers Only - with Janette Silvera - Dynamic Sounds - DY 3425 - 1982
 Your Precious Love - J.C. Records - 002 - 1995

References

2003 deaths
20th-century Jamaican male singers
1947 births